Mother's Choice is a local charity serving children without families and pregnant teenagers in Hong Kong. Mother's Choice was founded in 1987 by a small group of people concerned with the plight of Hong Kong's single teenagers and their family members coping with crisis pregnancy. Today, Mother's Choice works toward a stated goal of building stronger families.

Services

Pregnant Girls Services

Their services include a hotline, counseling and a hostel for those needing a place to stay during their pregnancy. Community education is also critical to their mission—they deliver sex education knowledge and information to young people, teachers and parents in the form of school talks, workshops and their bilingual website.

Child Care Home

In their Baby Care section, they care for up to 32 babies at any time ranging from newborn to 2 years old. In their Wee Care section, they care for up to 12 children from newborn to 6 years old with a wide range of special needs.

Adoption Services

In collaboration with the Social Welfare Department of Hong Kong, they provide local and international adoption services and advocate for their babies and children to join their forever families as soon as possible.

Foster Care Services

They provide temporary residential family care to children under 18 years of age whose parents cannot adequately care for them due to various reasons. At Mother's Choice, they care for 80 children under their Foster Care services.

Key People

Founders
 Ranjan Marwah
 Phyllis Marwah
 Helen Stephens
 Gary Stephens

Board of Directors
 Ronald Lee, Co-Chair
 Lily J Ng, Co-Chair
 Nancy Chang (Yang)
 Patricia Chu
 Matthew Ginsburg
 Sunita Makhija
 Phyllis Marwah
 Julie Parkinson
 Gretchen Ryan
 Gary Stephens
 Andrew Gardener

Ambassadors
 Purviz Shroff, Patron
 Rosanna Wong, Vice-Patron
 Cass Phang, Celebrity Spokesperson

References

Adoption, fostering, orphan care and displacement
Organizations established in 1987
Child-related organisations in Hong Kong